Charles Wesley Cameron (31 October 1927 – 7 January 2001) was a professional magician who specialised in a style known as bizarre magic. He was born in Edinburgh, Scotland, and has a younger brother.

He was a magician, and commonly dubbed as the Godfather of Bizarre Magic.

Early life 

Born on Halloween, 31 October 1927, Charles took a keen interest in magic from very early on in his life, and started conducting his own experiments at age seven. He was educated at Edinburgh's Royal High School and served with the Royal Air Force in the Middle East during World War II.

His only leaning to convention was when he became an accountant and worked with different commercial outlets throughout Edinburgh including the Sports Council. His brother George became highly qualified in the insurance field and is a published photographer and cartoonist.

At one stage in Charles' varied career he studied psychology, but this was not completed due to the need to study medicine and the dissections that this route entailed.

Magic career 

In 1947, Charles became one of the founding members of the Edinburgh Magic Circle . Working in tandem with Roy Scott and Harry Burnside, he took part in mentalism, straight magic, close-up magic etc. He has been elected President of the Edinburgh Magic Circle at least three times.

In the early days he performed on the club circuit with his own magic shows, cabaret spots at home and abroad, tarot readings, TV shows, newspaper and magazine features and numerous interviews. He was devastated when his close friend and mentor, Tony Andruzzi, died in tragic circumstances. Charles and Tony shared many likings – Famous Grouse whisky, smoking, and a deep interest in the bizarre to name a few.

Always interested in the weird, supernatural and mysterious, and a keen student of the occult, he had a regular slot on Radio Forth doing daily predictions and ghost stories. His home in Haddington housed his great collection of unusual artefacts and books.

Edinburgh Wax Museum 

Charles was owner and Curator of the Edinburgh Wax Museum on the Royal Mile from 1976 to 1989.  Here, he really came into his own, bringing in friends and family as supporting artistes. At night, the top floor of the museum was turned into Castle Dracula Theatre and Charles enjoyed some of the happiest days of his life. Working in the museum and entertaining visiting dignitaries and stars of stage and screen by day, Charles took on the mantle of "Count Dracula" – complete with his own coffin and cloak – by night. Performing mind-reading and mock ghostly seances, the theatre ran for almost three years in the mid 1980s.

The Wax Museum closed in 1989 and all the wax models were disposed of.  The museum had been one of the highlights of the Edinburgh tourist trail.

Radio and Television

Charles scripted and narrated his own weekly show, titled "Friday Frighteners" on Radio Forth. In addition, he prepared daily and weekly horoscopes for Radio Forth for several years and did a weekly hour-long phone in show on astrology. He scripted and narrated numerous programs on the supernatural for Radio Forth and the BBC. On Radio Forth he also had his own show "Beyond the Unknown". "Beyond the Unknown" lasted for four series. The first three series consisted of twenty-five programs and the fourth was a collection of ghost stories.

Charles appeared on Scottish television on numerous occasions and also on some French, German, Italian and American shows. He was a member of the Lothian Players, an amateur theatrical group, in which he took lead roles in various pantomimes and musical reviews. He had also been an extra in the films, 'Chariots of Fire', 'Lucia', 'Conquest of The South Pole' and 'Looking After Jo Jo'.

Magical Societies 

Charles was a member of many magical societies during his life.

 The Edinburgh Magic Circle (past President)
 International Brotherhood of Sorcerers
 The Esoteric Order of Pan (Arch Mage Ipsissimus)
 The Immortals
 Scottish Association of Magical Societies, ( Lecturer)
 Also retained for many years by the El Project
 The Magik Club (Patron)

Personal life 

Charles met and married Nan Sandilands. The couple settled in Haddington, East Lothian and raised two daughters Fiona and Lesley who, between them, gave Charles two grandchildren, Hannah and Jacob. Sadly Nan died of cancer in 1993. Charles subsequently moved back to Edinburgh in 1997.

With his clear diction and enunciation, he did readings for the blind while he lived in Haddington and was also a firm supporter of the Community Day Centre in the town. In any spare time available, he rattled collecting cans for various charities including the Poppy Appeal.

Death 

Charles died at around 10:45 on 7 January 2001, due to a stomach aneurysm.

Plaque 

Soon after the death of Charles W. Cameron, many of his friends discussed the possibility of having a plaque erected in the City of Edinburgh as a tribute to the Godfather of Bizarre Magic. It was hoped that the plaque would be erected on the building or in the entranceway of what had formerly been the Edinburgh Wax Museum, where Charles had been its curator during the daytime. During the evening he became 'Dracula' as he played the lead role in his own bizarre and spooky magic show. This show took place in a specially designed auditorium at the Wax Museum and it soon became famous as 'Castle Dracula'.

In 2002, it was decided that the actual site of the plaque should be in the entrance passage to the building, formerly the Wax Museum, which lies within a courtyard off the Royal Mile in Edinburgh Old Town. This entranceway at 142 New Assembly Close is perfect as it can easily be seen by all who pass by on this very busy road.

Permission to erect a plaque had to meet with City Council approval and many months were spent in contacting all possible departments and officers within the Council. Finally, permissions were received on the understanding that the proposed plaque was to be of an equal size and quality and placed directly below one already on the site. That existing plaque only gave the history of the building prior to the Wax Museum taking over. That meant the plaque to Charles had to be a hefty piece of cast bronze measuring 15" wide × 12" deep × 1/2" thick. Equally hefty was the price of this whole project as far more was involved in it than just the making and security fixing the plaque on site.

Many of Charles' friends and associates in magic, throughout the world, sent in donations to fund this project. Also, many of his local 'lay people' friends were only to happy to contribute too. Alex Wallace, partner of the late Charles and to whom donations were sent, was taken aback by the sheer kindness and generosity of people sending in money. This turned to amazement and emotional times when people who never met or had any contact with Charles generously came forward with donations. This shows just how much Cameron is regarded within the brotherhood of Bizarre Magic and mentalism.

Before its final fixing, a recess was made at the rear of the plaque so that a document containing all the names of the sponsors could be sealed behind it, a 'time capsule' with a difference.

In part of a dedication, Tony Andruzzi (Masklyn ye Mage) wrote in a gift copy of his  "The Negromicon of Masklyn ye Mage (1977)" to Charles, "the one who started all this".

In a copy of Anthony Raven's "The Necromantic Grimoire of Augustus Rapp" gifted to Charles, Raven wrote: "To Charles Cameron-a kindred soul who travels the same paths and whose writings inspired this work".

The plaque was unveiled on 10 October 2003, at the launch of the Charles W. Cameron Memorial Gathering, which was held during the weekend of 10, 11 and 12 October in Edinburgh.

Books 

As well as a love of books, he has written books as well – to date thirteen, with another five on the stocks. He also wrote The Cauldron (serial pamphlet) which has been recently reproduced by Karl Bartoni for The Magik Club.

Published books 
 Curiosities of Old Edinburgh
 Scottish Witches
 Scottish Witches, Revised and Enlarged Edition
 Handbook of Horror
 Witches' Brew
 Macabre and Mental Mysteries
 Devil's Diary
 Castle Dracula Mentalism
 Mind Your Magic

Awaiting publication 

 Beyond The Unknown
 The Land of Make Believe (a children's story book)

Unfinished books 

 Pardon My Weird Friends (Autobiography)
 Don't Blink-It's Magic
 Castle Dracula

References

External links 
 Charles Cameron Memorial Site
 Edinburgh Magic Circle Website
 Conquest of the South Pole on IMDB
 Looking After Jo Jo on IMDB

1927 births
2001 deaths
Scottish magicians
Entertainers from Edinburgh
People educated at the Royal High School, Edinburgh